Piotr Marcin (Peter) Gajewski (born January 12, 1959 in Warsaw, Poland) is a Polish former politician, artistic director, conductor, and founder of the National Philharmonic, currently in residence at the Music Center at Strathmore in North Bethesda, Maryland, in the United States. It is a successor ensemble to the National Chamber Orchestra.

He served on the Rockville City Council in Maryland from 2007 to 2011.

In addition to his appearances with the National Philharmonic, Maestro Gajewski is in much demand as a guest conductor. In recent years, he has appeared with most of the major orchestras in his native Poland, as well as the Buffalo Philharmonic, Royal Liverpool Philharmonic in England, the Karlovy Vary Symphony in the Czech Republic, the Okanagan Symphony in Canada and numerous orchestras in the United States. Gajewski made his opera debut in 1994 with Washington's Summer Opera Theatre.

Born in Poland, Piotr Gajewski began studying piano at age four. After emigrating to the United States in 1969, he continued his studies at the New England Conservatory Preparatory Division, Carleton College and the University of Cincinnati, College-Conservatory of Music, where he earned B.M. and M.M. degrees in Orchestral Conducting.

Upon completing his formal education, Gajewski continued refining his conducting skills at the 1983 Tanglewood Music Festival in Massachusetts, where he was awarded a Leonard Bernstein Conducting Fellowship and where his teachers included Leonard Bernstein, Seiji Ozawa, André Previn, Gunther Schuller, Gustav Meier and Maurice Abravanel.

Maestro Gajewski has conducted many important world premieres, including works by Steven Gerber, Joel Hoffman, Andreas Makris, Gerhard Samuel, Burnett Thompson, and Peter Ware. In 2000, his recording with the National Philharmonic (then the National Chamber Orchestra) of Steven Gerber’s Violin Concerto, Cello Concerto, and Serenade for String Orchestra on the Koch International label was released to enthusiastic reviews. Gajewski is also a winner of many prizes and awards, among them a prize at New York's prestigious Leopold Stokowski Conducting Competition.

References

1959 births
Living people
Polish conductors (music)
Male conductors (music)
Musicians from Rockville, Maryland
Polish emigrants to the United States
Maryland Democrats
Maryland city council members
Carleton College alumni
University of Cincinnati – College-Conservatory of Music alumni
Columbus School of Law alumni
21st-century conductors (music)
21st-century American male musicians